Richard Jessup (March 25, 1925 – July 21, 2012) was an American sailor. He competed in the Dragon event at the 1948 Summer Olympics.

References

External links
 

1925 births
2012 deaths
American male sailors (sport)
Olympic sailors of the United States
Sailors at the 1948 Summer Olympics – Dragon
People from Roslyn, New York